Samuel Baláž (born 25 August 1998) is a Slovak sprint canoeist who competed at the 2020 Summer Olympics.

Career
He participated at the 2018 ICF Canoe Sprint World Championships.

References

External links
 

1999 births
Slovak male canoeists
Living people
Sportspeople from Bratislava
ICF Canoe Sprint World Championships medalists in kayak
Canoeists at the 2019 European Games
European Games medalists in canoeing
European Games bronze medalists for Slovakia
Olympic canoeists of Slovakia
Canoeists at the 2020 Summer Olympics
Medalists at the 2020 Summer Olympics
Olympic medalists in canoeing
Olympic bronze medalists for Slovakia